Djuhri Masdjan, better known as Jojon, (5 June 1947 – 6 March 2014), was a veteran Indonesian comedian. A one-time member of the Jayakarta group, along with Cahyono and Uuk, he was easily recognized by his Adolf Hitler/Charlie Chaplin look alike Toothbrush moustache. After becoming a solo act, he played a significant supporting role on many TV shows such as SBY and Kerajaan Sahur.

Death
He died in the early hours of 6 March 2014 from a heart attack at the age of 66.

Filmography 
 Tiga Dara Mencari Cinta
 Oke Boss
 Apa Ini, Apa Itu
 Vina Bilang Cinta

References

External links

1953 births
2014 deaths
Indonesian comedians
People from Karawang Regency
Sundanese people